The Love Letter is an American romantic fantasy drama television film directed and produced by Dan Curtis, based on a short story of the same name by Jack Finney. The film stars Campbell Scott and Jennifer Jason Leigh, with David Dukes, Estelle Parsons, Daphne Ashbrook, Myra Carter, Gerrit Graham, Irma P. Hall, and Richard Woods in supporting roles. It premiered on CBS on February 1, 1998, as part of the Hallmark Hall of Fame anthology series.

Plot
Elizabeth Whitcomb lives near Boston in 1863 and writes a letter addressed to "Dearest" (no specific addressee), expressing her desire and hope to someday find someone to love with her whole heart and mind. She places the letter in the secret compartment of her desk.

In 1998, Scott Corrigan buys an antique desk. The store owner tells him the desk had belonged to a Union general. Re-conditioning it, he finds the secret compartment and Elizabeth's letter. He shows it to his mother who has a feeling Scott may actually be able to communicate with Elizabeth across time. She encourages him to reply, giving him a postage stamp from Elizabeth's period, and says he should mail it from the only post office now existing that was there in 1863. He does so, telling Elizabeth if she's patient, someday she will find her true love.

Back in 1863, the local letter carrier delivers Scott's letter to Elizabeth who is quite alarmed when reading it. She immediately goes to her desk and is shocked to find her letter missing from its secret compartment. She writes back to Scott demanding to know who he is and how he retrieved her letter.

In 1998, Scott hears from the desk what sounds like a letter had suddenly been dropped into it. Going to the secret compartment he is astonished to find Elizabeth's second letter. Scott replies, and soon Scott and Elizabeth are communicating across time. During this period, Scott goes to the home where Elizabeth lived 135 years ago, finding it is now owned by Clarisse, the granddaughter of Elizabeth's sister. Learning a bit more about her from this visit, in fact both of them sense each other's presence in the home across time. Scott's and Elizabeth's letters gradually become more personal and affectionate and eventually loving as they fall in love with each other. They realize however that their love is a hopeless one as 135 years separate them.

Meanwhile, in Elizabeth's time, her father tries to push her into a marriage with a man for whom Elizabeth has no feelings. Instead she meets a Union Army Officer, Caleb Denby, and begins to fall in love with him, while not losing any of her feelings toward Scott. (We, the audience, see that Caleb is the spitting image of Scott, something that Elizabeth at that point does not know.)

She writes to Scott of her new love, who in turn researches the Denby's name on the Internet, and finds that he was killed at the battle of Gettysburg. Scott frantically writes to Lizzy, as he has come to call her, and warns her to tell him that he should not go into that battle. Scottie (as she has come to call him) goes to mail his (as it turns out) last letter at the old post office only to find it on fire. He barely makes it into the P.O. and mails the letter before it burns down entirely.

Elizabeth receives Scottie's last letter, and Scottie gets out safely from the burning post office. With the destruction of the P.O., their ability to connect across time is irrevocably broken. She rushes to Gettysburg but arrives too late. Caleb has been mortally wounded and he tells her he wants to marry her, but then dies in her arms. When she returns home in grief, she is handed an earlier letter from Scotty which had been misplaced and which she had never seen until now. In it is a color photo that Scottie sent to her of himself. Seeing it, she realizes Scotty and Caleb are one and the same person, knows that both are now gone to her, saying she'll never forget him.

Back in 1998, Scott confesses to his fiancée everything about Elizabeth and that he has fallen in love with her. She reads Elizabeth's letters to Scott and in one of them, not only finds a photo of Elizabeth but one also of Elizabeth and Caleb and immediately sees that Caleb is identical to Scott. Although, she thinks the whole thing is crazy, she tearfully breaks off her engagement to Scott and leaves.

Scott then visits the old house one more time, to find that Clarisse has died, the house now left to Maggie, her caretaker and housekeeper. Maggie gives him an old wooden box Clarisse wanted him to have. Scott opens it to find Lizzys's poems (they were not in the box before Scotty wrote to her), his letters to her, and a worn but clear color picture of him, shocking Maggie completely.

The scene then turns to the church graveyard in the town where Elizabeth lived. Scott finds her grave and gravestone, at the bottom of which is carved, "I never forgot". The gravestone gives her birth date as 23.3.1834 and death as 7.8.1901 (aged 67). Elizabeth never married.

Then, a dog greets Scott in the graveyard, followed by its owner, Beth, the spitting image of Elizabeth. He then realizes the same thing Elizabeth did in her time; Scott is the reincarnation of Caleb, and Beth in 1998 is the reincarnation of Elizabeth. They have a brief friendly conversation after which Beth suggests coffee, and they go off together to get to know one another. The end of the film shows the book of Lizzy's poems featured in a bookstore, having finally been published by Scotty.

Cast
 Campbell Scott as Scott Corrigan/Colonel Caleb Denby
 Jennifer Jason Leigh as Elizabeth Whitcomb/Beth, the spitting image of Elizabeth
 David Dukes as Everett Reagle
 Estelle Parsons as Beatrice Corrigan
 Daphne Ashbrook as Debra Zabriskie
 Myra Carter as Clarice Whitcomb
 Gerrit Graham as Warren Whitcomb
 Irma P. Hall as Mae Mullen
 Richard Woods as Jacob Campbell
 Kali Rocha as Flossy Whitcomb
 Laurie Kennedy as Lavinia Whitcomb
 Edgar Smith as Potts the Postman
 Cara Stoner as Maggie the Maid
 George Gaffney as Bike Rider
 Tom Riis Farrell as Scott's Boss
 Mark Joy as Celebrity Author
 Linda Powell as Doctor

Reception

Critical response
The Love Letter received generally positive reviews. Adam Sandler of Variety praised the film, stating that "Scribe James Henerson admirably stretches the bounds of credulity without breaking them as he weaves an interesting tale" and "The chemistry between Campbell and Jason Leigh is first-rate and their perfs are compelling and credible. Director Dan Curtis keeps the pace brisk, knowing when to move the tale along or to slow for some weepy moments that are crucial and never indulgent. He is aided by Eric Van Haren Noman's camerawork, which uses the striking shades of fall to backdrop the story and its emotional underpinnings while soaking in Jan Scott’s lush production design. Bill Blunden's editing makes it all seamless." Will Joyner of The New York Times concluded his review writing "Against considerable creative odds, The Love Letter is its own sort of irresistible page-turner."

Accolades

Jack Finney's short story
The short story was written by Jack Finney and was first published in The Saturday Evening Post on August 1, 1959. It reprinted in the same magazine in January/February 1988 issue. The story has since appeared in several books.

Original story
In 1959, Jake Belknap, a young, lonely, single man in Brooklyn is looking for used furniture to furnish his recently acquired apartment.  Walking in a section of the borough that contains very large, ancient, magnificent mansions about to be torn down, he finds a yard sale of antique furniture from a mansion about to be demolished, and is fascinated by an antique roll-top desk from the 1800s, which he purchases.

After getting the desk home, he opens a drawer and finds original stationery from the previous century, along with several old stamps from that period. He also finds a love letter from a woman named Helen Elizabeth Worley, who lived in the Brooklyn of the 1880s, to a man whom she dreams about, although she is about to be engaged to a man she doesn't love.

Enchanted with the letter, he feels compelled to answer Helen, by writing to her using the old stationery, pen and ink, and putting an 1869 stamp on the letter (from his collection) and mailing it at the old "Wister" post office, which has been around since the 19th century in Brooklyn, unchanged by time.

He returns home and opens the second drawer, to find to his shock, that Helen has received his letter, and she wishes to know who he is and why he has written to her.  He writes her another letter, describing who he is, and the fact that he lived in the year 1959 and although they have fallen in love with each other, to meet is impossible because of the years between them. Expecting to receive a final, long love letter from her, he is surprised to find in the bottom drawer, only her picture and the inscription "I will never forget".

After doing research on her whereabouts, he finally finds her grave in a local cemetery, and on her tombstone is engraved, "I never forgot". Miss Worley had died in 1934.

The differences between the film and the short story
The film takes place in 1998, whereas in the book, the "modern" year is 1959.
The woman in the film, Elizabeth Whitcomb, lives in the American Civil War era, whereas Helen in the short story lives in the 1880s in Brooklyn, New York.
Scottie's mother does not appear in the short story at all, but in the film she acts as somewhat of a foil for Scottie.
The short story indicates that Helen Elizabeth's desk contains three separate hidden areas. Therefore, Jake is (only) able to receive a total of three letters from Helen. In the film, there is but one hidden compartment, which spawns new letters for Scottie every time Lizzie puts one into the compartment. Thus, in the short story the desk appears not to have any magical element to it.
In the film, Scottie enters Elizabeth's house twice and feels a connection to the past that she also feels. Nothing of the sort happens in the story.
The short story does not contain either of the additional lookalike characters, so that neither of them ever meets anyone who looks like the person with whom they have corresponded briefly.
Elizabeth's poetry, somewhat important in the film, is entirely absent in the short story.
In the film, Elizabeth is plagued by headaches; Helen does not have these in the short story.

References

External links
 
 The Love Letter at Hallmark Drama

1998 films
1998 television films
1998 fantasy films
1998 romantic drama films
1990s American films
1990s English-language films
1990s romantic fantasy films
American romantic drama films
American romantic fantasy films
American drama television films
CBS network films
Fantasy television films
Romance television films
Films about couples
Films about time travel
Films based on American short stories
Films based on works by Jack Finney
Films directed by Dan Curtis
Films set in 1863
Films set in 1998
Films set in Boston
Films shot in Virginia
Arranged marriage in fiction
Hallmark Hall of Fame episodes
Television films based on short fiction